St Charles' Hospital is a health facility in North Kensington, London. It is managed by the Central London Community Healthcare NHS Trust.

History
The foundation stone for the hospital was laid in 1879 and it was officially opened by the Prince and Princess of Wales as the St Marylebone Union Infirmary in 1881. A nurses' home was opened by Princess Christian in 1884. The facility became the St Marylebone Hospital in 1923 and was renamed St Charles' Hospital in 1930. It joined the National Health Service in 1948 and continues to operate as the St Charles Centre for Health and Wellbeing.

The main building is listed with grade II.

References

External links 
 

NHS hospitals in London
Grade II listed hospital buildings
Grade II listed buildings in the Royal Borough of Kensington and Chelsea